Gruppo Lucchini was the third largest Italian steel group after Gruppo Riva and Techint, with a 2005 production of 3.5 million tonnes. It is specialized in high quality long and special carbon steel products.

In 2005 the Russian steel and mining company Severstal became the majority shareholder (approx 60%) of Lucchini, the remainder being owned by Lucchini Family (30%) and other minor shareholders.

In 2007, Lucchini family bought back Lucchini RS, the part of Lucchini Group active in the railway rolling stock business. The two companies are therefore totally independent.

In 2010, Severstal acquired all the shares of Lucchini Group from Lucchini family and became the only shareholder of the company.

History
The Group's founder and former Honorary President Luigi Lucchini expanded and developed his father's business of crafting iron at Casto, Italy by building a small rolling mill to produce rebar during the period after World War II. Over the years, the craftsmanship was replaced by industry, investing in more and more productive rolling mills and building the first electric arc furnaces to melt scrap and transform it into steel ingots, ready for rolling. During this period Lucchini played a role within the Italian steel industry making a name for itself through unyielding determination. In the 1970s and 1980s, Lucchini Group forecasted market evolution and progressively widened its product range to include added value products through investment and acquisition. Through privatization, the group entered the integral cycle technology, widened its product range, invested its resources in R&D sector, set an increasing attention onto customer service and developed the internationalization process. In 2005, following a financial restructuring due to important investments in the plants, the majority of Lucchini Group was acquired by the Russian group Severstal, through a capital increase.

In 2007, the railway rolling stock division, Lucchini RS was sold back to Lucchini family.

In 2012, the French division Ascometal was sold to Apollo Private Equity Fund.

In 2013, Lucchini filed for bankruptcy.

Facilities
Lucchini has multiple domestic and international facilities. The main facility in Italy is in Piombino (active since 1908 and acquired by Lucchini in 1992); there are also facilities in Trieste (established by the Austrian Krainische Industrie Gesellschaft in 1896 and acquired by Lucchini in 1995), Condove, Lecco.

See also
 List of steel producers

References

Steel companies of Italy
Severstal